Kapaklı station is a station in Kapaklıi, Turkey. TCDD Taşımacılık operates a daily train, the Izmir Blue Train, from İzmir to Eskişehir. Prior to a schedule change in December 2017, the Karesi Express, 6th of September Express and the 7th of September Express stopped at the station.

The station was opened in 1890, by the Smyrna Cassaba Railway.

References

External links
Station timetable

Railway stations in Manisa Province
Railway stations opened in 1890
1890 establishments in the Ottoman Empire
Akhisar District